Alan Douglas Black (born 4 June 1943) is a Scottish former professional football player. Black, a left back, started and finished his career with Dumbarton. In between, he played for Sunderland and Norwich City. At Norwich, he was a member of the team that won the Second Division championship in 1972.

Honours
 Second Division Championship 1971–72

References

Sources
Canary Citizens by Mike Davage, John Eastwood, Kevin Platt, published by Jarrold Publishing, (2001),

External links 

1943 births
Living people
People from Alexandria, West Dunbartonshire
Association football fullbacks
Scottish footballers
Dumbarton F.C. players
Sunderland A.F.C. players
Norwich City F.C. players
Scottish Football League players
English Football League players
Drumchapel Amateur F.C. players
Footballers from West Dunbartonshire